New York's 17th congressional district is a congressional district for the United States House of Representatives located in Southern New York. It includes all of Rockland County and Putnam County, as well as most of Northern Westchester County, and portions of southern Dutchess County. It is represented by Republican Mike Lawler. It was one of 18 districts that voted for Joe Biden in the 2020 presidential election while being won or held by a Republican in 2022.

Mondaire Jones was first elected in 2020 to succeed the retiring Representative Nita Lowey. In the aftermath of the 2020 redistricting cycle, 18th district incumbent Sean Patrick Maloney announced his intention to run in the new 17th district instead of his existing seat; Jones subsequently opted to run in the 10th district to avoid a primary fight. However, Maloney lost to Republican Mike Lawler in the general election; Lawler subsequently became the first of his party to win this seat since 1981. Lawler's victory gained significant attention due to Maloney's position as chairman of the Democratic Congressional Campaign Committee; Maloney became the first chairman in over 40 years to lose reelection.

The district has a significant Jewish population, including very conservative Hasidic communities in Rockland County.

Voting

History

2023–present:

All of Putnam, Rockland
Parts of Dutchess, Westchester
2013–2023: map
All of Rockland 
Part of Westchester
2003–2013:
Parts of Bronx, Rockland, Westchester.
1993–2003: 
Parts of Bronx, Westchester.
1983–1993: 
Parts of Bronx, Manhattan.
1973–1983: 
All of Staten Island.
Parts of Manhattan.
1913–1973:
Parts of Manhattan.
1843–1853:
Montgomery

Various New York districts have been numbered "17" over the years, including areas in New York City and various parts of upstate New York. From 2003-2013, the 17th district encompassed portions of the Bronx, Westchester County, and Rockland County. It included the neighborhoods of Norwood, Riverdale, Wakefield, Williamsbridge, and Woodlawn in the Bronx; the city of Mount Vernon and parts of Yonkers in Westchester; and Monsey, Nanuet, Pearl River, Orangetown, Sparkill, Spring Valley, Haverstraw, and Suffern in Rockland County.

List of members representing the district 

The District was historically the East Side Manhattan district (known as the "silk stocking district" for the wealth of its constituents). In the 1970s it was a Staten Island seat. It became the west side Manhattan seat in the 1980s. It became a Bronx-based seat in the 1992 remap and was shifted north into Rockland county in 2002 to absorb terrain from the deconstruction of the old 20th District.

Previously the 19th District covered much of the Bronx portion of the seat in the 1980s; while in the 1970s the 23rd District covered most of the Bronx area.

1803–1833: One seat

1833–1843: Two seats
From 1833 to 1843, two seats were apportioned to the 17th district, elected at-large on a general ticket.

Seat A

Seat B

1843–present: One seat

Election results 

Note that in New York State electoral politics there are numerous minor parties at various points on the political spectrum. Certain parties will invariably endorse either the Republican or Democratic candidate for every office, hence the state electoral results contain both the party votes, and the final candidate votes (Listed as "Recap").

See also

List of United States congressional districts
New York's congressional districts
United States congressional delegations from New York

References 

 Congressional Biographical Directory of the United States 1774–present
 2004 House election data Clerk of the House of Representatives
 2002 House election data "
 2000 House election data "
 1998 House election data "
 1996 House election data "

17
Constituencies established in 1803
1803 establishments in New York (state)